Cabo Rojo Airport  is a Caribbean coastal airport in the Dominican Republic  southeast of Pedernales, a port city on the border with Haiti. The airport offers domestic flights to destinations within the Dominican Republic.

West approach and departures are over the water. Runway 12 has a  displaced threshold.

The Cabo Rojo VOR/DME (Ident: DCR) is located on the field.

See also

Transport in Dominican Republic
List of airports in Dominican Republic

References

External links
OpenStreetMap - Cabo Rojo Airport
SkyVector - Cabo Rojo Airport
OurAirports - Cabo Rojo Airport

Airports in the Dominican Republic
Buildings and structures in Pedernales Province